Listen is the sixth studio album by French DJ and record producer David Guetta. It was released on 21 November 2014. It features collaborations with artists from the R&B, hip hop, alternative rock and pop worlds such as Sam Martin, Emeli Sandé, The Script, Nicki Minaj, John Legend, Nico & Vinz, Ryan Tedder (the lead singer of pop rock band OneRepublic), Sia, Magic!, Bebe Rexha, South African male choral group Ladysmith Black Mambazo, Ms. Dynamite, Elliphant, Birdy, Jaymes Young, Sonny Wilson, Vassy, and Skylar Grey. It also features additional production from Guetta's frequent collaborator Giorgio Tuinfort, Avicii, Afrojack, Nicky Romero, Showtek, and Stadiumx among others, with additional writing credits from Austin Bisnow, Jason Evigan, Julie Frost, and The-Dream among others.

Listen was preceded by the release of five singles: "Shot Me Down", "Bad", "Blast Off", "Lovers on the Sun" and "Dangerous". The album reached the top 10 in eighteen countries, including France, Germany, the United Kingdom, the United States and Canada. Reviews were mixed with critics praising the songwriting and catchiness of songs, but criticized the repetitive formula of the album. The album debuted at number 8 on the UK Albums Chart and peaked at number 4 on the US Billboard 200.

Background
Listen is David Guetta's first studio album in three years since the release of the commercially successful Nothing but the Beat (2011), which sold 3 million copies worldwide. According to Guetta, Listen is his most personal album yet, reflecting his divorce from his wife of 22 years, Cathy Guetta: "Until today I was doing lots of songs about happiness and love and sexiness and just having a party – it was basically my life, you know? And lately, my personal life has been a little more difficult, so it reflects also on the album, on the things that we're talking about, on the type of chords. I've never done this, because even for me it was all about making the people dance." Guetta also said he wanted to reinvent himself with the album, steering away from the urban and dance sound he became famous for with One Love (2009):

"When you're a little bit at the top of the game, what is left except being afraid to go down? I never want to feel like this, so I thought that the best way to avoid it was to kind of start from scratch again. Until today I was always starting with the beat and then writing the song on it. This time I was starting with piano, voice and guitar, then producing around the song. I've really changed everything, like the way I was working, the people I was working with – everything."

During an interview with Billboard, Guetta said he has moved away from the current EDM and house sound on his previous two internationally released albums One Love and Nothing but the Beat with Listen, by adding elements of other music such as classical music, acoustic music, and piano ballads: "I miss soul and emotion. A lot of EDM lately is based on production tricks that make it sound huge. I think it's not enough. These songs can be played by a classical orchestra, a rock band, or a funk band, and they would be great. It's not like, 'Oh wow, if you don't have this huge distorted kick, there's nothing else.'"

Singles
Before the release of the lead single, it was preceded by 3 singles. "Shot Me Down" was released on 3 February 2014 as the first stand-alone single. The track features vocals from American singer Skylar Grey. The song reached number four on the UK Singles Chart. The music video was entirely animated and features visual imagery similar to that on the single cover. It is available on the deluxe edition of Listen and on Listen Again. "Bad" was released on 17 March 2014 as the second stand-alone single. The track features vocals from Australian singer Vassy and production from Showtek. The song reached number twenty-two on the UK Singles Chart. Again, the music video was entirely animated and features scenes of zombies on motorcycles with guns, whilst the army are trying to defend the earth. It is available on the deluxe edition of Listen and on Listen Again. "Blast Off", Guetta's collaboration with Kaz James was released on 9 June 2014. The song was not included on Listen but appears on the Listen Again track list.

 "Lovers on the Sun" was released as the lead single from the album on 30 June 2014. The song features vocals from American singer Sam Martin. The track reached number one on the UK Singles Chart, and was certified Silver by the BPI. The music video is the first of the album campaign to feature live action footage, but Guetta does not appear in the video. The video features scenes set in what is depicted to be a spaghetti western. As of April 2015, the song has sold 800,000 copies worldwide.
 "Dangerous" was released as the second single from the album on 5 October 2014. The track once again features vocals from Sam Martin. The track peaked at number five on the UK Singles Chart. As of June 2015, the song has sold 1,000,000 copies worldwide with over 400,000 and 200,000 copies in Germany and the UK alone.
 "What I Did for Love" was released as the third single from the album. The track features vocals from British singer Emeli Sande. The song was added to the BBC Radio 1 playlist on 26 January 2015, and was released officially in the UK on 21 February 2015. The track peaked at number six on the UK Singles Chart, and reached the top-ten in Scotland, Israel, Austria and Hungary as well as the top-twenty in Australia, Germany and Ireland. The track has since gone on to sell in excess of 200,000 copies in the UK alone; spending over 20 consecutive weeks on the UK Singles Chart.
 "Hey Mama" impacted Top 40 mainstream radio in the US as the fourth single from the album on 17 March 2015. The song features vocals from Nicki Minaj and Bebe Rexha and also features DJ Afrojack. The single proved successful, reaching the top-ten in Australia, UK and the United States as well in 13 additional countries. The song was released to European radio in May 2015.
 On 31 July 2015, David Guetta announced the release of "Sun Goes Down" as the fifth single from the album, with additional production from Dutch electronic duo Showtek featured Canadian reggae-pop band MAGIC!, and Dutch singer Sonny Wilson.
 "Clap Your Hands" was unveiled as a teaser from the re-release, Listen Again on 2 October 2015. It's a collaboration between Guetta and GLOWINTHEDARK.
 The second single from the re-release, a new version of "Bang My Head" which features vocals by Sia and Fetty Wap, was released on 30 October 2015. The original version peaked at number 79 in France.
 "Pelican" was released on iTunes and Google Play as promotional single on 20 November 2015. On 16 May 2016 the full version of track was released exclusively on Beatport.

Other charted songs
 Several other songs charted in France and Germany; "The Whisperer" peaked at number 96 in France and "No Money No Love", "Goodbye Friend", "Listen" and "I'll Keep Loving You" peaked at numbers 94, 93, 85 and 96 in Germany respectively.

Critical reception

Listen received generally mixed reviews from music critics. At Metacritic, which assigns an average rating out of 100 to reviews from mainstream critics, the album received an average score of 51, based on 9 reviews, which indicates mixed or average reviews. In a mixed review, Megan Buerger of Billboard criticized the album for following the same formula throughout the whole album, however praising Guetta's songwriting on the album. In another mixed review, David Jeffries of AllMusic praised a majority of the tracks included on the album, but criticized Guetta for "seeming like a featured artist on his own album."

In a negative review of the album, Blue Sullivan of Slant Magazine criticized the tracks for being overly repetitive, and the overuse of autotune on the album. In another negative review of the album, Killian Fox of The Guardian criticized the album for not differing from the formula of any of his other albums, and for Guetta playing it safe by sticking in his comfort zone. In a mixed review of the album, Michaelangelo Matos of the Rolling Stone called the songwriting on the album bland, along with criticizing some of the featured artists on the album such as Sam Martin for delivering weak vocal performances. Despite the complaints, he praised the club friendliness of the songs on the album.

Commercial performance
Listen debuted at number 8 on the UK Albums Chart, selling 24,385 copies in its first week. In the United States, the album debuted at number 22 on the Billboard 200, with first-week sales of 25,000 copies. Listen also debuted at number one on the Dance/Electronic Albums chart. After 24 weeks on the Billboard 200, Listen had a big rise, jumping from number 30 to number 4, selling 43,000 units (29,000 in pure album sales), making it Guetta's highest-charting album in the United States. The album topped Billboard Top Dance/Electronic Albums for 5 non-consecutive weeks. Listen was certified gold by the Recording Industry Association of America (RIAA), for combined album sales, on-demand audio, video streams, track sales equivalent of 500,000.

Track listing

Listen Again 

Notes
 signifies a co-producer.
 signifies an additional producer.
 signifies a vocal producer.
"Yesterday" features a sample from "Rehab" by Amy Winehouse, however, it is performed by Bebe Rexha.
In the physical version of the album, an unreleased version of "The Death of EDM" was used for the Listenin' Continuous Mix.

Charts

Weekly charts

Year-end charts

Certifications

Release history

References

2014 albums
Albums produced by David Guetta
David Guetta albums
Atlantic Records albums
Parlophone albums
Albums produced by Nicky Romero
Albums produced by Jason Evigan